Napet Šou (Tense Show) is name of the book accompanied by homonymous fifth album by Serbian writer and hip-hop artist Marčelo. The album contains 19 tracks and it was made by a crew that counts over 50 people. Book-album was released on October 1, 2014 and it broke all records of publishing houses Laguna and Delfi SKC along with Marčelo's personal record in book and album signing.

Track listing

References

2014 albums
2014 books
Marčelo albums
Serbian books